The 41st Tirreno–Adriatico road cycling race took place from March 8 to March 14, 2006, over seven stages. It was won by Dutchman Thomas Dekker of the Rabobank team.  The points classification was won by Alessandro Petacchi and the King of the Mountains jersey went to José Joaquín Rojas.

Stage Results

Stage 1 - March 8: Tivoli – Tivoli, 167 km

Stage 2 - March 9: Tivoli – Frascati, 171 km

Stage 3 - March 10: Avezzano – Paglieta, 183 km
General Classement leader Paolo Bettini crashed and was forced to retire from the race after 80 km following a tangle with Lars Bak of the CSC team.

Stage 4 - March 11: Paglieta – Civitanova Marche, 219 km

Stage 5 - March 12: Servigliano – Servigliano ITT, 20 km

This stage was an individual time trial.

Stage 6 - March 13: S.Benedetto Del Tronto – Torricella Sicura, 182 km

Stage 7 - March 14: Campli - S.Benedetto Del Tronto, 166 km

Points classification 
 Alessandro Petacchi  37 pts
 Thor Hushovd  34
 Mikhaylo Khalilov  28
 Erik Zabel  26
 Oscar Freire Gomez  25
 Alessandro Ballan  25
 Riccardo Ricco'  18
 Fabian Cancellara  17
 Rinaldo Nocentini  17
 Igor Astarloa  16

Mountains classification 
 José Joaquín Rojas  11 pts
 Daniele Contrini  11
 Matteo Priamo  8
 Ignacio Gutierrez Cataluna  7
 Alessandro Ballan  5
 Vladimir Efimkin  5
 Fortunato Baliani  5
 Joseba Albizu Lizaso  5
 Giampaolo Cheula  5
 Ivan Basso  3

Teams Classification
 Discovery Channel 82h 38' 09"
 Team CSC + 0' 17"
 Liberty Seguros - Wurth + 2' 40"
 Team Gerolsteiner + 2' 58"
 Phonak Hearing Systems + 3' 34"
 Saunier Duval - Prodir + 4' 51"
 Rabobank + 4' 53"
 Team T-Mobile + 4' 56"
 Barloworld + 6' 10"
 Euskadi Euskaltel + 6' 53"

Sources
Cyclingnews.com Tirreno-Adriatico 2006 page Accessed April 8, 2006
Eurosport Tirreno-Adriatico 2006 page Accessed April 8, 2006

2006
2006 UCI ProTour
2006 in Italian sport